Belarus participated at the 2017 Summer Universiade in Taipei, Taiwan with 34 competitors in 9 sports.

Competitors 
The following table lists Belarus' delegation per sport and gender.

Medalists

Athletics

Men

Field Events

Combined Events

Decathlon

Women

Track Events

Field Events

Fencing

Gymnastics

Rhythmic

Roller Sports

Swimming

Men

Women

Table Tennis

Taekwondo

Weightlifting

Wushu

References

Nations at the 2017 Summer Universiade
2017 in Belarusian sport
Belarus at the Summer Universiade